Reich Security Head Office Referat IV B4, known as RSHA IV B4 (German:  IV D4 until March 1941, or Judenreferat), was a sub-department of Germany's Reich Security Head Office (Reichssicherheitshauptamt or RSHA) and the Gestapo during the Holocaust. Led by SS-Obersturmbannführer Adolf Eichmann, RSHA IV B4 was responsible for "Jewish affairs and evacuation" in German-occupied Europe, and specifically for the deportation of Jews from outside Poland to concentration or extermination camps. Within Poland, the liquidation of the ghettos and transport of Jews was handled by the SS and local police departments.

Following a reorganization of the RSHA, in March 1941 Eichmann's Office changed name and remit from Group of countries IV D (Ländergruppe IV D) to Group of churches IV B (Kirchengruppe IV B), and was finally called Referat IV B 4. RSHA IV B4 managed the categorization of Jews, the imposition of anti-Jewish legislation in the country concerned, the eventual removal of Jews from that country, and their deportation to a camp and usually the gas chamber. Unit IV B4 was also in charge of the Reich Association of Jews in Germany, which oversaw all Jewish organizations.

Jews were carried to the camps in freight trains that had to be booked and paid for. The Deutsche Reichsbahn (German state railway) charged a one-way fare for the deportees and a return fare for the guards. The RSHA was billed for trains carrying Jews.

Hierarchy

Unit IV B4 was based in Kurfürstenstraße 115/116, Berlin. The hierarchy, according to Raul Hilberg, was:

RSHA: led by Reinhard Heydrich until his death in June 1942, followed by Heinrich Himmler and Ernst Kaltenbrunner
Amt IV (Gestapo): Heinrich Müller
IV-B (Sects): Albert Hartl
IV-B-4 (Jews) Adolf Eichmann
IV-B-4-a (Evacuations): Rolf Günther
General matters: Fritz Wöhrn
Transport: Franz Novak
"Single cases": Ernst Moes
IV-B-4-b (Law): Friedrich Suhr, followed by Otto Hunsche
Deputy: Otto Hunsche
Finance and property: Richard Gutwasser
Foreign areas: Friedrich Boßhammer

Notes

Works cited

Further reading
Hauff, Lisa (2012). Mahnort Kurfürstenstrasse 115/116: vom Brüdervereinshaus zum Dienstort Adolf Eichmanns. Berlin: Hentrich & Hentrich. 

Gestapo
Government of Nazi Germany
Reich Security Main Office
The Holocaust